Howard and Theodore Lydecker, always known—and billed—as such, were Howard "Babe" Lydecker (June 8, 1911 – September 26, 1969) and Theodore Lydecker (November 7, 1908 – May 25, 1990), a special effects team primarily working as contract staff members of Republic Pictures.  They are best remembered as the producers and photographers of some of the best miniature effects of their time.

Career
They both worked at Republic from its creation in 1935 until the company could no longer afford to maintain full-time contract players and behind-the-camera artists in the middle 1950s, after which they went freelance and found themselves in significant demand for both film and television work.  Their miniature effects made Republic serials the best for visual effects, far outstripping their competitors at Universal (where special effects maestro John P. Fulton, ASC was forbidden from working on serials) and Columbia Pictures.  Their success came from building large, detailed models and filming them in natural light, often in forced perspective to create realistic impressions that they were in fact life-size in relation to other objects and people in a shot, instead of the small models used by others, and the use of slow motion to give the models the appearance of realistic weight when in motion.  For instance, in The Adventures of Captain Marvel, the visuals of Captain Marvel flying appear to be an actual man in flight, not a matted or superimposed image.

They were nominated for a Best Visual Effects Academy Award in 1941 for Women in War and Howard was nominated again in 1943 for Flying Tigers.

Later they worked in feature films and Irwin Allen productions such as Lost in Space and Voyage to the Bottom of the Sea.  In 1966 Howard won the Emmy for "Individual Achievement In Cinematography" with L. B. Abbott for Voyage to the Bottom of the Sea.

Partial filmography

Darkest Africa (1936)
Women in War (1940) - Oscar nominated
Adventures of Captain Marvel (1941)
Flying Tigers (1942) - Oscar nominated
Flame of Barbary Coast (1945) 
Fair Wind to Java (1953) 
Commando Cody: Sky Marshal of the Universe (1953)
Voyage to the Bottom of the Sea (1964-1968) - Emmy winner

See also
 Lydecker House

References

External links
 
 
 Howard & Theodore Lydecker: Miniature Effects Geniuses

Special effects people
Emmy Award winners
Film serial crew
Sibling duos